Semyonovka (Semenov) is a village in the Issyk-Kul Region of Kyrgyzstan. It is part of the Issyk-Kul District. Its population was 3,439 in 2021.

It is the start of an asphalt road that leads up the Chon Ak-soo valley to a ski resort. Nearby are Scythian burial mounds from the 5th-3rd centuries and a dacha built for Leonid Brezhnev (he used it only once).  West on highway A363 is Grigor'evka, and east Anan'evo.

References
  
Bradt Travel Guides

Populated places in Issyk-Kul Region